The ambassador of Morocco to the United Kingdom is the highest diplomatic representative of Morocco in the United Kingdom.

Heads of mission

Gallery

See also
Morocco–United Kingdom relations
List of ambassadors of the United Kingdom to Morocco
Anglo-Moroccan alliance
Embassy of Morocco, London

References

External links
Embassy of Morocco in London

 
United Kingdom
Morocco